Tura Lok Sabha constituency is one of the two Lok Sabha (parliamentary) constituencies in Meghalaya state in northeastern India.

Vidhan Sabha segments
Presently, Tura Lok Sabha constituency comprises 24 Vidhan Sabha (legislative assembly) segments, which are:

Members of Lok Sabha

Election results

General Election 2019

By-Election 2016

General Election 2014

General Election 2009

General Election 2004

General Election 1980
 Purna A. Sangma (INC-Indira) : 82,307 votes  
 Grohonsing  Marak (AHL) : 13,058

General Election 1977
 Purna A. Sangma (INC) : 40,288 votes  
 Mody K. Marak (IND) : 26,254

See also
 Tura
 List of Constituencies of the Lok Sabha

References

External links
 Nationalist Congress Party website
 Previous Lok Sabha Members by Constituency Lok Sabha website
Tura lok sabha  constituency election 2019 date and schedule

Lok Sabha constituencies in Meghalaya
West Garo Hills district